Don't Disturb This Groove is the fourth studio album recorded by American R&B/Synthpop band The System. Released by Atlantic Records in 1987, the album became a highlight of the System's career, as it was the most commercially successful album, surpassing its hugely successful debut, Sweat. It reached No. 62 on the Billboard 200 and No. 1 on the R&B Albums chart. The album was produced by its band members, David Frank and Mic Murphy.

Successful singles from this album included the band's first (and, to date, only) top 10 hit on the pop charts with the contemporary R&B ballad title track "Don't Disturb This Groove" and urban hit "Nighttime Lover".

Doug E. Fresh was featured on the track "House of Rhythm."

Critical reception 
Reviewing for AllMusic, Ron Wynn gave the album four stars, out of five, and highlighted the title track as the peak of the System's "techno-funk" music. By contrast, The Village Voice critic Robert Christgau relegated the album to his list of failures below his "Consumer Guide" column.

Track listing 
All songs written by David Frank & Mic Murphy, except "Come as You Are (Superstar)" written by Frank, Murphy, and Paul Pesco.

Personnel
Mic Murphy – producer, electric guitar on "Modern Girl," lead vocals, backing vocals
David Frank – producer, keyboards, drums
Audrey Wheeler, Dolette McDonald, Fonzi Thornton, Michelle Cobbs, Phillip Ballou – backing vocals
Omar Hakim – drums on "Save Me"
Ira Siegel, Steve Stevens – electric guitar
Paul Pesco  – electric guitar
Jimmy Maelen – percussion
Andy Snitzer – saxophone
Doug E. Fresh – Human Beat Box Rappin' on "House of Rhythm"
B.J. Nelson – solo vocals on "Don't Disturb this Groove" and "Didn't I Blow Your Mind," backing vocals
Howard Jones - solo vocals on "Didn't I Blow Your Mind," backing vocals
New West Horns - horns

Charts

Weekly charts

Year-end charts

References

1987 albums
The System (band) albums
Atlantic Records albums